The 2001 Canada Masters doubles was the men's doubles event of the one hundred and twelfth edition of the Canada Masters; a WTA Tier I tournament and the most prestigious men's tennis tournament held in Canada. Sébastien Lareau and Daniel Nestor were the defending champions but they competed with different partners that year, Lareau with Justin Gimelstob and Nestor with Sandon Stolle. Gimelstob and Lareau lost in the first round to Mark Knowles and Brian MacPhie, as did Nestor and Stolle to Jan-Michael Gambill and Simon Larose. Jiří Novák and David Rikl won in the final 6–4, 3–6, 6–3 against Donald Johnson and Jared Palmer.

Seeds
Champion seeds are indicated in bold text while text in italics indicates the round in which those seeds were eliminated.

Draw

Final

Top half

Bottom half

External links
 2001 Canada Masters Doubles Draw

2001 Canada Masters and the Rogers AT&T Cup
Doubles